The Military ranks of South Sudan are the military insignia used by the South Sudan People's Defence Forces.

Commissioned officer ranks
The rank insignia of commissioned officers.

Other ranks
The rank insignia of non-commissioned officers and enlisted personnel.

References

External links
 Uniforminsignia.org (Sudan People´s Liberation Army)
 

Sudan, South
Military of South Sudan